William or Bill Ashton may refer to:

 Bill Ashton (cartoonist), South African cartoonist 
 Bill Ashton (jazz musician) (born 1936), British jazz musician
 Brian Ashton (rugby union) (born 1946), full name William Brian Ashton
 William Howard Ashton (born 1943), real name of Billy J. Kramer, English singer
 Will Ashton (1881–1963), British-Australian artist 
 William Ashton (MP) (1575–1646), British Member of Parliament for Hertford, 1621–1625 and Appleby 1626, 1628
 William Ashton, Chief Engineer of the Oregon Short Line Railroad (fl. c. 1881), after whom the city of Ashton, Idaho was named
 William E. Ashton (1859–1933), American gynaecologist and Army officer during World War I